A listing of the Pulitzer Prize award winners for 1997:

Journalism awards

Letters, Drama and Music Awards

 Biography or Autobiography:
Angela's Ashes: A Memoir by Frank McCourt (Scribner)
 Fiction:
Martin Dressler: The Tale of an American Dreamer by Steven Millhauser (Crown)
 History:
Original Meanings: Politics and Ideas in the Making of the Constitution by Jack N. Rakove (Alfred A. Knopf)
 General Non-Fiction:
Ashes to Ashes: America's Hundred-Year Cigarette War, the Public Health, and the Unabashed Triumph of Philip Morris by Richard Kluger (Alfred A. Knopf)
 Poetry:
Alive Together: New and Selected Poems by Lisel Mueller (Louisiana State University Press)
 Drama:
 No award given.
 Music;
Blood on the Fields by Wynton Marsalis (Boosey & Hawkes), premiered on January 28, 1997, at Woolsey Hall, Yale University, New Haven, Connecticut

References

External links
 

Pulitzer Prize
Pulitzer Prize
Pulitzer Prizes by year